Russell Conway Smith (August 4, 1944 – April 1, 2001) was a professional American football player who played running back for four seasons for the San Diego Chargers. He had played high school football and basketball for Stranahan High School in Fort Lauderdale, Florida, and college football at the University of Miami.

References

1944 births
2001 deaths
People from Bronxville, New York
Players of American football from New York (state)
American football running backs
Miami Hurricanes football players
San Diego Chargers players
American Football League players